Xestia lyngei is a species of moth belonging to the family Noctuidae.

It is native to Northern Europe and Subarctic America.

References

lyngei
Moths described in 1923